Omari Akhmedov (born October 12, 1987) is a Russian professional mixed martial artist who currently competes in the Light Heavyweight division of Professional Fighters League (PFL). He previously fought in the Ultimate Fighting Championship.

Background
Akhmedov was born on October 12, 1987 in the town of Kizlyar in modern-day Dagestan, Russia, in a Lak family and is a devout Sunni Muslim. Like many children in Dagestan, Akhmedov engaged in freestyle wrestling from a young age and would go on to hold an accomplished career in the sport before transitioning to MMA. Before his career in MMA, Akhmedov also had accomplished careers in combat sambo, as well as Russian hand-to-hand combat and Russian pankration.

Mixed martial arts career

Early career
Akhmedov made his professional MMA debut on January 30, 2010, when he faced Iskhan Zakharian at ProFC: Fight Night 2. He won the fight via rear-naked choke. Following this, Akhmedov would compile a professional record of 12–1 before being signed by the Ultimate Fighting Championship in September 2013.

Ultimate Fighting Championship
Akhmedov signed a four-fight deal with the UFC in September 2013.

In his promotional debut, Akhmedov faced Thiago Perpétuo  on November 9, 2013 at UFC Fight Night 32. It was a back-and-forth fight that saw both men rocked by punches before Akhmedov won the fight via knockout. The win also earned him his first  Fight of the Night bonus award. After the fight, Akhmedov expressed a desire to move down to welterweight.

In his welterweight debut, Akhmedov faced Gunnar Nelson on March 8, 2014 at UFC Fight Night: Gustafsson vs. Manuwa. He lost the fight via guillotine choke submission in the first round.

Akhmedov faced Mats Nilsson on January 3, 2015 at UFC 182. He won the fight by unanimous decision.

Akhmedov faced Brian Ebersole on June 6, 2015 at UFC Fight Night 68, replacing an injured Alan Jouban. He won the fight via TKO after Ebersole was unable to continue after the first round due to a knee injury sustained from a kick by Akhmedov.

Akhmedov was expected to face Lyman Good on December 10, 2015 at UFC Fight Night 80. However, Good was pulled from the bout in late October and was replaced by Sérgio Moraes.

Akhmedov next faced Elizeu Zaleski dos Santosi on April 16, 2016 at UFC on Fox 19. After arguably winning the first two rounds, Akhmedov was stopped via TKO in the third round. The back and forth action earned both participants Fight of the Night honors.

Akhmedov was tabbed as a short notice replacement for Dominique Steele and faced Kyle Noke on November 27, 2016 at UFC Fight Night 101. He won the fight via unanimous decision.

Akhmedov faced Abdul Razak Alhassan on May 28, 2017 at  UFC Fight Night 109. He won the fight by split decision.

Akhmedov faced Marvin Vettori on December 30, 2017 at UFC 219.  The back-and-forth fight ended in a majority draw.

Akhmedov was expected to face CB Dollaway on September 15, 2018 at UFC Fight Night 136. However, Akhmedov pulled out of the fight in early September and was replaced by promotional newcomer Artem Frolov.

Akhmedov faced Tim Boetsch on March 9, 2019 at UFC Fight Night 147. He won the fight by unanimous decision.

Akhmedov faced Zak Cummings on September 7, 2019 at UFC 242. He won the fight by unanimous decision.

Akhmedov faced Ian Heinisch on December 14, 2019 at UFC 245. He won the fight via unanimous decision.

Akhmedov faced Chris Weidman on August 8, 2020 at UFC Fight Night 174.
He lost the fight via unanimous decision.

Akhmedov was briefly linked to a rematch with  Marvin Vettori on December 12, 2020 at UFC  256. However, Akhmedov was removed from the bout in mid-October for undisclosed reasons.

Akhmedov was expected to face Tom Breese on January 16, 2021 at UFC on ABC 1. During fight week, the UFC opted to move the bout to UFC on ESPN: Chiesa vs. Magny. He won the bout via second round arm triangle submission. 

Akhmedov faced Brad Tavares on July 10, 2021 at UFC 264.  He lost the fight via split decision.

After his bout with Tavares, it was announced on July 15th, that Akhmedov was released from the UFC.

Professional Fighters League 
Akhmedov faced Jordan Young on October 27, 2021 at PFL 10. He lost the bout via TKO in the third round.

2022 season 
Akhmedov faced Viktor Pešta on April 23, 2022 at PFL 1. He won the bout after knocking Pešta out in first round.

Akhmedov faced Teodoras Aukštuolis on June 17, 2022 at PFL 4. He won the bout after choking out Teodoras in the second round via arm-triangle choke.

Akhmedov was scheduled to face Antônio Carlos Júnior in the Semifinals off the Light Heavyweight tournament on August 5, 2022 at PFL 7. However, Antonio suffered an ACL injury requiring surgery, being replaced by Josh Silveira for the playoffs. Akhmedov won the bout via unanimous decision.

Akhmedov faced Rob Wilkinson in the finals of the Light Heavyweight tournament on November 25, 2022 at PFL 10. He lost the bout after the fight was stopped by the doctor due to a cut after the second round.

2023 season 
Akhmedov was set to start the 2023 season against Will Fleury on April 1, 2023 at PFL 1. However, Akhmedov was forced to withdraw due to suffering an injury and was replaced by Krzysztof Jotko.

Championships and awards

Mixed martial arts
 Ultimate Fighting Championship
 Fight of the Night (Two times)

Pankration
Pankration Federation Russia
Russian National Pankration Champion (Two times)

Hand-to-hand combat
Russian Union of Martial Arts
Russian National Hand-to-Hand Combat Champion (Two times)

Sambo
Combat Sambo Federation of Russia
Dagestan Combat Sambo Champion

Mixed martial arts record

|-
|Loss
|align=center|24–8–1
|Rob Wilkinson
|TKO (doctor stoppage)
|PFL 10
|
|align=center|2
|align=center|5:00
|New York City, New York, United States
|
|-
|Win
|align=center|24–7–1
|Josh Silveira
|Decision (unanimous)
|PFL 7
|
|align=center|3
|align=center|5:00
|New York City, New York, United States
|
|-
|Win
|align=center|23–7–1
|Teodoras Aukštuolis
|Technical submission (arm-triangle choke)
|PFL 4
|
|align=center|2
|align=center|2:50
|Atlanta, Georgia, United States
|
|-
|Win
|align=center|22–7–1
|Viktor Pešta
|KO (punches)
|PFL 1
|
|align=center|1
|align=center|1:25
|Arlington, Texas, United States
|
|-
|Loss
|align=center|21–7–1
|Jordan Young
|TKO (punches)
|PFL 10 
|
|align=center|3
|align=center|1:32
|Hollywood, Florida, United States
|
|-
|Loss
|align=center|21–6–1
|Brad Tavares
|Decision (split)
|UFC 264 
|
|align=center|3
|align=center|5:00
|Las Vegas, Nevada, United States
|  
|-
|Win
|align=center|21–5–1
|Tom Breese
|Submission (arm-triangle choke)
|UFC on ESPN: Chiesa vs. Magny 
|
|align=center|2
|align=center|1:41
|Abu Dhabi, United Arab Emirates
|  
|-
|Loss
|align=center|20–5–1
|Chris Weidman
|Decision (unanimous)
|UFC Fight Night: Lewis vs. Oleinik
|
|align=center|3
|align=center|5:00
|Las Vegas, Nevada, United States
|
|-
|Win
|align=center|20–4–1
|Ian Heinisch
|Decision (unanimous)
|UFC 245 
|
|align=center|3
|align=center|5:00
|Las Vegas, Nevada, United States
|
|-
|Win
|align=center|19–4–1
|Zak Cummings
|Decision (unanimous)
|UFC 242 
|
|align=center|3
|align=center|5:00
|Abu Dhabi, United Arab Emirates
|
|-
|Win
|align=center|18–4–1
|Tim Boetsch
|Decision (unanimous)
|UFC Fight Night: Lewis vs. dos Santos 
|
|align=center|3
|align=center|5:00
|Wichita, Kansas, United States
|
|-
|Draw
|align=center|
|Marvin Vettori
|Draw (majority)
|UFC 219
|
|align=center|3
|align=center|5:00
|Las Vegas, Nevada, United States
|
|-
|Win
|align=center|17–4
|Abdul Razak Alhassan
|Decision (split)
|UFC Fight Night: Gustafsson vs. Teixeira
|
|align=center|3
|align=center|5:00
|Stockholm, Sweden
|
|-
|Win
|align=center|16–4
|Kyle Noke
|Decision (unanimous)
|UFC Fight Night: Whittaker vs. Brunson
|
|align=center|3
|align=center|5:00
|Melbourne, Australia
|  
|-
|Loss
|align=center|15–4
|Elizeu Zaleski dos Santos
|TKO (punches and knees)
|UFC on Fox: Teixeira vs. Evans
|
|align=center|3
|align=center|3:03
|Tampa, Florida, United States
|
|-
|Loss
|align=center|15–3
|Sérgio Moraes
|TKO (punches)
|UFC Fight Night: Namajunas vs. VanZant
|
|align=center|3
|align=center|2:18
|Las Vegas, Nevada, United States
|   
|-
|Win
|align=center|15–2
|Brian Ebersole
|TKO (knee injury)
|UFC Fight Night: Boetsch vs. Henderson
|
|align=center|1
|align=center|5:00
|New Orleans, Louisiana, United States
|
|-
|Win
|align=center| 14–2
|Mats Nilsson
|Decision (unanimous)
|UFC 182
|
|align=center|3
|align=center|5:00
|Las Vegas, Nevada, United States
|
|-
|Loss
|align=center| 13–2
|Gunnar Nelson
|Submission (guillotine choke)
|UFC Fight Night: Gustafsson vs. Manuwa
|
|align=center| 1
|align=center| 4:36
|London, England
|
|-
|Win
|align=center|13–1
|Thiago Perpétuo
|KO (punches)
|UFC Fight Night: Belfort vs. Henderson 2
|
|align=center|1
|align=center|3:31
|Goiânia, Brazil
|
|-
|Win
|align=center|12–1
|Fabricio Nascimento
|Submission (guillotine choke)
|Nord Desant
|
|align=center|1
|align=center|0:53
|Yugra, Russia
|
|-
|Win
|align=center|11–1
|Rafal Haratyk
|KO (punch)
|Battle of Stars 1
|
|align=center|1
|align=center|2:26
|Makhachkala, Russia
|
|-
|Win
|align=center|10–1
|Sergey Karpov
|Submission (guillotine choke)
|Colosseum Battles Champions
|
|align=center|1
|align=center|4:58
|Ufa, Russia
|
|-
|Win
|align=center|9–1
|Aleksander Boyko
|Submission (triangle choke)
|Odessa Golden Cup
|
|align=center|1
|align=center|1:02
|Odessa, Ukraine
|
|-
|Win
|align=center|8–1
|Aliyor Isakov
|TKO (punches)
|Governors Cup: Saint Petersburg
|
|align=center|1
|align=center|3:05
|Saint Petersburg, Russia
|
|-
|Win
|align=center|7–1
|Talekh Nazhav-Zade
|TKO (punches)
|Governors Cup: Saint Petersburg
|
|align=center|1
|align=center|0:20
|Saint Petersburg, Russia
|
|-
|Win
|align=center|6–1
|Akbar Nabavizade
|TKO (punches)
|Governors Cup: Saint Petersburg
|
|align=center|1
|align=center|2:30
|Saint Petersburg, Russia
|
|-
|Win
|align=center|5–1
|Mikhail Istomin
|Submission (armbar)
|ProFC: Grand Prix Global Finals
|
|align=center|1
|align=center|1:22
|Volgograd, Russia
|
|-
|Win
|align=center|4–1
|Vladimir Semenov
|Decision (split)
|ProFC Grand Prix Global: Russia I
|
|align=center|2
|align=center|5:00
|Volgograd, Russia
|
|-
|Win
|align=center|3–1
|Musa Arslangadzhiev
|TKO (punches)
|Urkarakh Fights
|
|align=center|1
|align=center|3:50
|Urkarakh, Russia
|
|-
|Loss
|align=center|2–1
|Michail Tsarev
|Submission (guillotine choke)
|ProFC: Russia Cup Stage 2
|
|align=center|2
|align=center|4:29
|Ufa, Russia
|
|-
|Win
|align=center|2–0
|Magomed Umarov
|Decision (unanimous)
|Pancration Black Sea Cup
|
|align=center|2
|align=center|5:00
|Anapa, Russia
|
|-
|Win
|align=center|1–0
|Ishkhan Zakharian
|Submission (rear-naked choke)
|ProFC: Fight Night 2
|
|align=center|1
|align=center|3:40
|Rostov-on-Don, Russia
|
|-

See also
 List of current PFL fighters
List of male mixed martial artists

References

External links
 

1987 births
Laks (Caucasus)
Dagestani mixed martial artists
Middleweight mixed martial artists
Living people
People from Kizlyar
Russian Muslims
Russian Sunni Muslims
Russian expatriates in the United States
Russian male mixed martial artists
Russian sambo practitioners
Ultimate Fighting Championship male fighters
Mixed martial artists utilizing freestyle wrestling
Mixed martial artists utilizing sambo
Mixed martial artists utilizing ARB